Foteini Varvariotou (born 11 June 1974) is a Greek gymnast. She competed in five events at the 1988 Summer Olympics.

References

1974 births
Living people
Greek female artistic gymnasts
Olympic gymnasts of Greece
Gymnasts at the 1988 Summer Olympics
Gymnasts from Thessaloniki